Stecker is a surname. Notable people with the surname include:

Aaron Stecker (born 1975), American football player
Curley Stecker (1892–1924), American animal trainer
Franz Stecker, Austrian luger

See also
Stecher (surname)
Stucker (surname)